Sam Terry Page (born 30 October 1987 in Croydon) is an English footballer who plays for Chipstead.

Career
Page was associated with Crystal Palace in his mid-teens, but started his senior career with Milton Keynes Dons in November 2006 as he made his debut for the team against Brighton & Hove Albion, in which he scored their goal in a 4–1 defeat. He had loan spells at Aylesbury United both during the 2005–06 season, and at the start of the 2006–07 season. He joined Hendon on loan in late September 2006, scoring on his debut. In February 2007 he moved to Cambridge United on a month's loan. This loan was extended until the end of the 2006–07 season in March. He returned to Hendon on a month's loan in October 2007, after a spell with Walton & Hersham. This was extended in November. In January 2008 he made an appearance in the Hillier Senior Cup for Rushden & Diamonds. Despite scoring a goal in his combined debut and final game, he failed to win an extension to the contract. Instead, a few days later he signed another loan deal with Hendon, until the end of the season. He moved on to Horsham on a 12-month contract the following season, to reduce his travelling time.

Page signed for Sutton United during the 2010 close season, and played 50 games to help the side win the 2010–11 Isthmian League Premier Division title.
On 8 June 2012 it was announced Page signed for Conference South side Havant and Waterlooville. Later moves include Staines Town in December 2018, Kingstonian in June 2013, and most recently Chipstead in November 2017.

Personal life
Sam Page played alongside his younger brother and former Leyton Orient player, Jack, at Horsham. Their father Terry is a former footballer for Crawley Town.

References

External links

 Rushden & Diamonds Players - Player A-Z - Sam Page

1987 births
Living people
Footballers from Croydon
English footballers
Association football fullbacks
Association football central defenders
English Football League players
Milton Keynes Dons F.C. players
Cambridge United F.C. players
Hendon F.C. players
Horsham F.C. players
Sutton United F.C. players
Havant & Waterlooville F.C. players
Staines Town F.C. players
Kingstonian F.C. players
Rushden & Diamonds F.C. players